"Crank My Tractor" is a single by Canadian country music artist Michelle Wright. Released in 1996, it was the second single from her album For Me It's You. The song reached #1 on the RPM Country Tracks chart in December 1996.

Chart performance

Year-end charts

References

1996 singles
Michelle Wright songs
Arista Nashville singles
1996 songs
Songs written by Tim DuBois
Songs written by Monty Powell